My Son is a 1928 Soviet silent drama film directed by Yevgeni Chervyakov and starring Gennadiy Michurin, Anna Sten and Pyotr Berezov.

Plot
A wife admits to her husband that the child to whom she gave birth is not from him. After this the life of the protagonist changes dramatically.

Interesting facts
The film was lost during the Great Patriotic War.

In 2008, five 16mm film reels of a film without the original titles, labeled as "El Hijo del otro" ("The son of another") were found in Argentina. Copies of the film were kept in the archive of the Museum of Cinema in Buenos Aires. Some film critics regard this event as "the biggest archival discovery in the history of Russian cinema in the last half century," and liken it to the "release of the second part of Ivan the Terrible.

Cast
 Gennadiy Michurin as Andrey Surin  
 Anna Sten as Olga Surina  
 Pyotr Berezov as Gregor 
 Lyudmila Semyonova as Neighbour  
 Nikolay Cherkasov as Pat  
 Boris Chirkov as Patashon  
 Fyodor Nikitin as A thief 
 Ursula Krug as Neighbour 
 Nadezhda Yermakovich

References

Bibliography 
 Rollberg, Peter. Historical Dictionary of Russian and Soviet Cinema. Scarecrow Press, 2008.

External links 
 

Films directed by Yevgeni Chervyakov
Soviet silent films
Soviet drama films
1920s Russian-language films
Soviet black-and-white films
1928 drama films
Silent drama films